The Zhaocheng Jin Tripitaka is a Chinese copy of the Buddhist canon dating from the Jin dynasty (1115–1234).

The Jin Tripitaka was originally created at the Tianning Temple in Shanxi province around 1149, funded by donations from a woman named Cui Fazhen and her followers. It was presented by Kublai Khan to the Guangsheng Temple in Pingyang, where it was rediscovered in 1933. Since the Guangsheng Temple is located in Zhaocheng, the document was renamed the Zhaocheng Jin Tripitaka.

With around 7,000 chapters, it is the longest extant printed work of the Jin dynasty. It contains a number of sutras which are missing from subsequent editions of the canon.

References

Tripiṭaka
Chinese Buddhist texts
1140s books
Jin dynasty (1115–1234)
History of Shanxi
Linfen